Acid Angel from Asia (abbreviated as AAA) is the first sub-unit of South Korean girl group TripleS, formed by Modhaus in 2022. It is composed of members Kim Yoo-yeon, Kim Na-kyoung, Gong Yu-bin and Jeong Hye-rin. The quartet debuted on October 28, 2022, with the extended play Access.

History

2022: Formation and debut with Access 
On February 18, 2022, Modhaus announced that they would be launching the world's first "fan-participating girl group" named TripleS and that the group was set to be introduced in the first half of the year. The group is led by the CEO Jaden Jeong who helped to produce artists such as Loona and OnlyOneOf and worked with companies such as JYP Entertainment, Woollim Entertainment, Sony Music Korea and Blockberry Creative.

Prior to joining TripleS, all members of AAA were previously involved in the entertainment industry. Jeong Hye-rin was previously a child actress under Kids Planet and made her acting debut in the 2018 web-series Between Us. She has also appeared in a commercial for Japanese textbooks. Jeong Hye-rin and Kim Na-kyoung are former P Nation trainees. Kim Na-kyoung is the younger sister of Bibi and appeared in the final episode of SBS' competition show The Fan. Kim Yoo-yeon alongside Lee Ji-woo were former contestants on the MBC survival show My Teenage Girl where Kim Yoo-yeon was eliminated during the final episode placing 8th. Gong Yu-bin was a contestant on the TV Chosun junior cooking show I am Chef where she made it to the final Top 3.

Acid Angel from Asia were initially revealed every fortnight between May 2022 until September 2022 as Jeong Hye-rin, Kim Yoo-yeon, Kim Na-kyoung and Gong Yu-bin alongside other 4 members. On September 16, it was announced that TripleS will start preparing for sub-unit debut activities with each unit having 4 members. The two sub-units were named Acid Angel From Asia and +(KR)ystal Eyes, with Acid Angel From Asia having their debut activities first in October. The lineup was voted by fans and Acid Angel From Asia made their official debut with the first extended play Access on October 28, 2022.

On November 16, it was reported by Wikitree that the sub-unit had disbanded due to not reaching the sales goal of having 100k album sold. The members will continue to promote in the main group, TripleS. However, in an interview with NME, MODHAUS's CEO Jaden Jeong clarified that the unit did not disband but won't be releasing any new albums and explained that "disbanding" does not have the same meaning in the TripleS system and that fans will be able to see the unit again in the future. He also stated that video content was still being released to boost sales.

Members 
 Jeong Hye-rin (정혜린)
 Kim Yoo-yeon (김유연) – leader
 Kim Na-kyoung (김나경)
 Gong Yu-bin (공유빈)

Discography

Extended plays

Singles

Videography

Music videos

Notes

References 

2022 establishments in South Korea
K-pop music groups
Musical groups established in 2022
Musical groups from Seoul
South Korean dance music groups
South Korean girl groups